The Gravesend–Tilbury Ferry is a passenger ferry across the River Thames east of London. It is the last public crossing point before the Thames reaches the sea.

History 
See also notes on Tilbury

There were many ferries crossing the Thames in the area around Tilbury: one such operated between Higham and East Tilbury. This was owned by the Manor of South Hall in East Tilbury which itself was owned by Rochester Bridge.

The principal ferry operated between West Tilbury and Gravesend and was under the ownership of the Lord of the Manor of Parrock in Milton-next-Gravesend. A sketch-map of 1571 shows evidence of two jetties, the one on the north bank leading to a northward road crossing the marsh. There are also houses marked on the marsh itself, which was important for sheep grazing; and there is some evidence to suggest that the ferry was used for the cross-river transport of animals and wool. 

Although the 17th-century drawing might suggest a boat too small for large consignments, the long-established Gravesend market encouraged such traffic, and a contemporary account suggests that one of the boats used was a hoy, a forerunner of the Thames sailing barge. The rights to the Gravesend–Tilbury ferry were purchased by Gravesend Town Council in 1694. 

At the same time, the governor of Tilbury Fort obtained the right to a ferry in the opposite direction. This originally operated from within the fort, but was later moved to a ferry house (now the World's End public house) just to the west of the fort. Sailing and rowing boats operated between Gravesend and Tilbury until they were replaced by a steam ferry service in 1855.

In 1852, the London, Tilbury and Southend Railway (LTS) was authorised to operate a ferry but only for its own passengers. In 1862, the Gravesend Town Council ferry and the Board of Ordinance ferry were purchased by the LTS. The railway company and its successors continued to operate the ferry until 1984.

Car ferries were introduced in 1927 and discontinued in 1964, following the opening in 1963 of the first Dartford Tunnel.

Services
From 17 September 2012, ferries from Gravesend use the Town Pier instead of the West Street terminal.
The ferry is currently operated by Jetstream Tours and runs every 30 minutes between about 6 am and 7 pm from Monday to Saturday. The ferry operation is subsidised by both Thurrock Council and Kent County Council.

Cycles are carried at no extra charge.

Vessels employed from 1855

London, Tilbury and Southend Railway
Owned by London, Tilbury and Southend Railway (LTS):

All vessels in service in 1912 were transferred to the Midland Railway Company, and then became part of the London, Midland and Scottish Railway's fleet after 1923.

London, Midland and Scottish Railway car ferries

Car ferries introduced to service by London, Midland and Scottish Railway (LMS):

In 1948 control of the service was transferred to the British Transport Commission (BTC) London Midland Region and all operational vessels were taken under their control. In 1959 that control was changed to the Eastern Region of British Railways.

Eastern Region of British Railways

Vessels brought into service by the Eastern Region:

Vessels since 1995

See also
 Crossings of the River Thames

References

External links
Gravesend to Tilbury (Thurrock Council)

Transport in Thurrock
Transport in Kent
River Thames ferries
Gravesend, Kent
British Rail ferry service
Tilbury